Mycosphaerella caryigena is a fungal plant pathogen.

See also
List of Mycosphaerella species

References

caryigena
Fungal plant pathogens and diseases
Fungi described in 1924